Little Oakley Football Club is a football club based in Little Oakley, Essex, England.

History
Despite evidence of a football club in Little Oakley prior to World War I, the club were founded in 1947 as Little Oakley War Memorial. In 1974, the club changed their name to the current guise of Little Oakley.

The club was promoted as champions of the Essex and Suffolk Border League in 2017, joining the Eastern Counties League. It was the club's fifth Premier Division title.

In 2021 the club were promoted to the Essex Senior League based on their results in the abandoned 2019–20 and 2020–21 seasons.

Ground
Following the club's promotion to the Eastern Counties League, the War Memorial Ground required several upgrades. The ground was enclosed and the pitch surrounded with railing and hardstanding. Floodlights were installed, with a small covered stand built at the clubhouse end.

Honours
Essex and Suffolk Border League
Premier Division champions 1986–87, 1987–88, 1992–93, 1993–94, 2003–04, 2016–17
Division One champions 1985–86

References

External links
Official website

Football clubs in England
Football clubs in Essex
Essex and Suffolk Border Football League
Eastern Counties Football League
Association football clubs established in 1947
1947 establishments in England
Essex Senior Football League